Raymond Joseph Lohier Jr. (born December 1, 1965) is a Canadian-born American lawyer who serves as a United States circuit judge of the United States Court of Appeals for the Second Circuit. Formerly, he was an Assistant United States Attorney for the Southern District of New York and a Senior Trial Attorney in the United States Department of Justice Civil Rights Division. He was the chief of the securities and commodities fraud task force in the criminal division of the U.S. Attorney's office. He was recommended by New York Senator Charles Schumer for the nomination to the seat on the United States Court of Appeals for the Second Circuit that was vacated by Sonia Sotomayor when she was elevated to the Supreme Court of the United States. Lohier is the first Haitian-American to serve as an Article III Federal Judge and to be confirmed (unanimously) by the United States Senate as a Judge for the Second Circuit in New York.

Early life and education 

Lohier Jr. was born in Montreal, Quebec, of Haitian heritage. He graduated from Friends' Central School in Philadelphia in 1984. He went on to earn a Bachelor of Arts degree, graduating cum laude from Harvard College, followed by a Juris Doctor from the New York University School of Law, where he served as Editor in Chief of the NYU Annual Survey of American Law. He worked as a law clerk for Judge Robert P. Patterson Jr. of the United States District Court for the Southern District of New York.

Legal career 

Early in his career, Lohier worked as an associate in the law firm Cleary Gottlieb Steen & Hamilton. From 1997 to 2000, Lohier served as a Senior Trial Attorney with the United States Department of Justice Civil Rights Division, where he worked under Bill Lann Lee and spearheaded employment discrimination-related litigation and worked on other civil rights matters of importance to the federal government. He became an Assistant United States Attorney in 2000, and later became chief of the narcotics unit. He later became chief of the Securities and Commodities Fraud Task Force.

Lohier may be most known in his career at the U.S. Attorney's office for having helped to oversee the investigation into the Madoff investment scandal and worked as a prosecutor on the Marc Dreier case.

Federal judicial service 

On February 8, 2010, Chuck Schumer announced that he would recommend Lohier for a seat on the United States Court of Appeals for the Second Circuit that was vacated by Sonia Sotomayor, who was elevated to the Supreme Court of the United States on August 6, 2009. On March 10, 2010, President Barack Obama nominated Lohier to the seat. On December 19, 2010, the Senate confirmed Lohier by a 92–0 vote. He received his judicial commission on December 20, 2010.

Personal 

Lohier's wife, Donna Hae Kyun Lee, is Senior Associate Dean of Clinical Programs and a professor at the CUNY School of Law. The couple married in 1999 and lives in Brooklyn, New York In 2021, Lohier was elected to the Harvard Board of Overseers for a six-year term ending in 2027.  Lohier is also an elected member of the American Law Institute.

See also 
 List of African-American federal judges
 List of African-American jurists

References

External links 

1965 births
21st-century American judges
African-American judges
American politicians of Haitian descent
Assistant United States Attorneys
Friends' Central School alumni
Harvard College alumni
Judges of the United States Court of Appeals for the Second Circuit
Living people
New York University School of Law alumni
People associated with Cleary Gottlieb Steen & Hamilton
People from Brooklyn
People from Montreal
United States court of appeals judges appointed by Barack Obama